Shamal Bhatt (Gujarati: શામળ ભટ્ટ) was a Gujarati narrative poet of the medieval Gujarati literature. He is known for his "padya-vaarta" (narrative poetry).

Life
The dates of his birth differ according to sources. He was born either in 1694 or in 1766. His father's name was Vireshwar and mother's name was Anandibai. Nana Bhatt was his teacher. He was born in Veganpur (Now Gomtipur in Ahmedabad). He had difficulty in earning due to competition of traditional story-teller Puranis and Bhavaiyas who performed Bhavai. Thus he has drawn stories from his predecessors and reinterpreted them in popular form to captivate his audience. He later moved to Sinhuj (near Mahemdavad now) on request and help of Rakhidas, a landlord. He died either in 1769 or in 1765.

Works
Shamal has composed 26 works. His narrative poetry was based on many Sanskrit works of his predecessors and folk tales. He adapted them in narrative poetry and added his imagination. Some of those Sanskrit works are Simhasana Dvatrinshika, Vetalpanchvinshanti, Shukasaptati, Bhojaprabandha. His prominent works are Simhasana Battisi, Vetal Pachchisi, Suda Bahoteri. All three of these works had format of tales within tales. They have many magical and imaginative things like transportation of souls, flying shoes and speaking animals. Vikram was the lead character in them. They also contained riddles and aphorisms. His other works include Nand-Batrisi, Shukadevakhyan, Rakhidas Charitra, Vanechar ni Varta, Panch-danda, Bhadra-Bhamini, Rewa-Khand, Chandra-Chandraawati, Madan-Mohana, Padmavati, Baras Kasturi. Chhappas (six stanza epigrams) are incorporated in these tales which describe wisdom and wit.

Angada-vishti, Ravana-Mandodari Samvad, Draupadi-Vastraharan, Shivpuran are akhyanas based on Hindu mythology and epics. Other works are Patai Raval no Garbo, Ranchhodji na Shloko, Bodana-akhyan, Udyam-Karma-Samvad.

One of his poems inspired Mahatma Gandhi to adopt the philosophy of satyagraha, the resistance to authority through mass civil disobedience.

Further reading

References

External links
 

Gujarati-language writers
Gujarati-language poets
Year of death uncertain
Writers from Ahmedabad
Poets from Gujarat
18th-century Indian poets